In Greek mythology, the name Iphimede (Iphimédē) may refer to:
Iphigeneia, called "Iphimede" in the Catalogue of Women
Iphimedeia, called "Iphimede" by Parthenius of Nicaea